Love Is Reality is an album by the American soul musician Al Green, released in 1992.

The album was nominated for a Grammy Award, in the "Best Contemporary Soul Gospel Album" category. It peaked at No. 29 on Billboards Top Gospel Albums chart.

Production
Recorded in Dallas, Love Is Reality was produced by Tim Miner. It was an attempt to marry Green's traditional gospel and soul sounds to new jack swing. Kirk Whalum played saxophone on the album; El DeBarge contributed backing vocals.

Green cowrote all of the album's songs. He raps on "You Don't Know Me".

Critical reception

Stereo Review wrote that Love Is Reality "would have been a better album if the gospel flavor were stronger, but Green pulls it all off with his customary aplomb." The Chicago Tribune thought that some songs "are nearly indistinguishable from standard urban contemporary fare, with slick arrangements and occasionally ambiguous lyrics that are a far cry from standard hymns."

The Calgary Herald determined that "the compositions here aren`t bad, but it`s Green`s fluidly fervent, honey-toned voice which sets this disc apart." USA Today called the album "a disappointment," and listed it as the third worst R&B album of 1992. The Richmond Times-Dispatch deemed it a "high-tech, contemporary R&B gospel album." The Boston Herald considered it to be "the weakest album of Green's career."

AllMusic wrote that "Christian dance-pop producer Tim Miner works from formulas, while Green runs on inspiration."

Track listing

 Personnel 
 Al Green – vocals 
 Tim Miner – keyboards, bass, backing vocals, arrangements
 Mark Stitts – keyboards, guitars, arrangements 
 Gregory O'Quinn – acoustic piano, organ
 David Ebensberger – keyboards, arrangements
 John Wirtz – keyboards, drum programming 
 Robert Wirtz – keyboards, drum programming 
 Mike Stitts – drum programming, arrangements 
 Paul Leim – drums 
 Charlie Barnett – percussion 
 Kirk Whalum – saxophone 
 Rodney Booth – brass
 Ron Jones – brass, brass arrangements 
 John Osborne – brass
 Larry Dalton – strings, string arrangements 
 Karen Adams – backing vocals 
 Cindy Cruse – backing vocals 
 El DeBarge – backing vocals 
 Walter Johnson – backing vocals 
 Kindred – backing vocals 
 Mike Wilson – backing vocals Choir'
 Karen Adams, Darryn Belieu, Yvonne Belieu, Cindy Cruse, David Ebensberger, Walter Johnson, Tim Miner, Karen Penrod, Tara Sipus, Mike Stitts and Mike Wilson

Production 
 Tom Ramsey – executive producer 
 Tim Miner – producer, engineer, mixing 
 Jeff Adams – engineer 
 Mark Cassimatis – engineer 
 David Ebensberger – engineer 
 Gene Eichelberger – engineer 
 Win Kutz – engineer, mixing 
 Mark Stitts – engineer 
 Mike Stitts – engineer 
 Jeff Toone – engineer 
 John Wirtz – engineer 
 Robert Wirtz – engineer 
 John Matousek – mastering 
 Amy Linden – art direction 
 Buddy Jackson – design 
 Russ Harrington – photography

References

Al Green albums
1992 albums
Epic Records albums